The 36th edition of the World Allround Speed Skating Championships for Women was held on 22 and 23 February in Assen at the De Bonte Wever ice rink.

Title holder was the Netherlander Atje Keulen-Deelstra.

Distance medalists

Classification

 * = Fall

Source:

References

1975 World Women's Allround
1975 in women's speed skating
1975 in Dutch sport
International speed skating competitions hosted by the Netherlands
World Women's Allround
February 1975 sports events in Europe
1975 in Dutch women's sport